Bullet Boy by Robert Del Naja and Neil Davidge of Massive Attack is the soundtrack to the film, directed by Saul Dibb.

Track listing
 "Brave New World And Score" – 28:58
 "Bullet Boy (Vox)" – 4:08

Massive Attack albums
2004 soundtrack albums
Drama film soundtracks